The 2021 Kwibuka Women's T20 Tournament was a women's T20I cricket (WT20I) tournament held in Rwanda from 6 to 12 June 2021. This was the seventh edition of the annual Kwibuka T20 Tournament, first organised 2014 in remembrance of the victims of the 1994 genocide against the Tutsi. All matches were played at the Gahanga International Cricket Stadium in Kigali. Tanzania won the 2019 edition but did not defend the title this year. The 2020 edition of the tournament was cancelled due to the COVID-19 pandemic.

The 2021 edition of the tournament was originally announced as a five-team event featuring the women's national sides of Rwanda, Botswana, Namibia, Nigeria and two-time champions Uganda. On 29 May 2021, it was confirmed that three-time champions Kenya would also participate. Botswana, Namibia and Nigeria played in the Kwibuka tournament for the first time. The six teams were placed into two groups of three. However, Uganda withdrew from the tournament on 3 June 2021 due to positive COVID-19 tests within their camp. Prior to their withdrawal, Uganda had named a provisional squad for the tournament.

The Rwanda Cricket Association stated their intent to further enhance the status of the Kwibuka tournament by including Zimbabwe on a regular basis in future years and inviting leading associate teams from Europe and elsewhere, stating that they had already held positive talks with the German Cricket Federation and the Brazilian Cricket Association.

Namibia won all four of their round-robin matches to become the first team to qualify for the semi-finals. Hosts Rwanda beat Nigeria in their penultimate group match to confirm their berth in the semi-finals. Kenya also secured a place in the semi-finals. In the final group game, Nigeria beat Botswana by three wickets to become the fourth and final team to qualify for the semi-finals. Namibia and Kenya advanced to the final with comfortable semi-final victories over Nigeria and Rwanda, respectively.

Rwanda finished the tournament in third place, after beating Nigeria by eight runs in the play-off match. Kenya won their fourth Kwibuka T20 title after defeating Namibia by 7 wickets in the final. Kenyan all-rounder Queentor Abel was named player of the tournament, after scoring 165 runs and taking 7 wickets.

Squads
The following squads were named for the tournament:

Round-robin

Points table

Matches

Play-offs

Semi-finals

Third-place play-off

Final

Team of the tournament
The following 14 players were named in the team of the tournament:
  Sune Wittmann
  Queentor Abel
  Yasmeen Khan (wk)
  Sarah Wetoto
  Adri van der Merwe
  Margaret Ngoche (c)
  Kayleen Green
  Amantle Mokgotlhe
  Blessing Etim
  Henriette Ishimwe
  Victoria Hamunyela
  Cathia Uwamahoro
  Salome Sunday
  Marie Bimenyimana

References

External links
 Series home at ESPN Cricinfo

 Cricket in Rwanda
2021 Kwibuka Women's T20 Tournament
 Rwanda in international cricket
2021 in women's cricket
 Associate international cricket competitions in 2021